Nadia Gray (born Nadia Kujnir; 23 November 1923 – 13 June 1994) was a Romanian film actress.

Biography

Gray was born into a Jewish family in Bucharest. Her father moved to Romania from Russia, and her mother was from Akkerman (Bessarabia). She left Romania for Paris in the late 1940s to escape the Communist takeover after World War II. Her film debut was in L'Inconnu d'un soir in 1949. Perhaps her best-known role was in the Federico Fellini film La Dolce Vita (1960).

She played a guest role in an episode of the television series The Prisoner ("The Chimes of Big Ben", 1967).

Personal life
She was first married to N. Goldenberg (later Herescu), a wealthy businessman from Chișinău, then to Constantin Cantacuzino, a Romanian aristocrat who was one of Romania's top fighter aces of the war. They were married from 1946 to his death in 1958. Her third husband was Manhattan attorney Herbert Silverman (1912-2003). They were married from 1967 to her death in 1994. She died in New York City from a stroke.

Partial filmography
Most of Gray's films were non-English language productions.

 L'inconnu d'un soir (1949) - Édith aka Marie-Ange
 The Spider and the Fly (1949) - Madeleine Saincaize
 Monseigneur (1949) - La duchesse de Lémoncourt
 Night Without Stars (1951) - Alix Delaisse née Malinay
 Valley of Eagles (1951) - Kara Niemann
 Wife for a Night (1952) - Geraldine
 Deceit (1952) - Anna Comin
 Top Secret (1952) - Tania
 Puccini (1953) - Cristina Vernini
 La vierge du Rhin (1953) - Maria Meister
 Ivan, Son of the White Devil (1953) - Principessa Alina
 Finalmente libero! (1954) - Carla
 100 Years of Love (1954) - Countess Muriella di Lucoli (segment "Pendolin")
 Gran Varietà (1954)
 Pietà per chi cade (1954) - Anna Savelli
 Melody of Love (1954) - Nadia Sandor
 Neapolitan Carousel (1954) - Pretty tramp
 The Women Couldn't Care Less (1954) - Henrietta Aymes
 Crossed Swords (1954) - Fulvia
 House of Ricordi (1954) - Giulia Grisi
 The Two Orphans (1954) - Diane de Vaudrey - countess de Linières
 Cardinal Lambertini (1954) - Isabella di Pietramelara
 I cinque dell'Adamello (1954) - Magda
 Casta Diva (1954) - Giuditta Pasta
 Le avventure di Giacomo Casanova (1955) - Margherita Teresa von Kleinwert
 The Last Five Minutes (1955) - Valeria Roberti, moglie di Filippo
 La moglie è uguale per tutti (1955) - Lea
 Music in the Blood (1955) - Gina Martelli
 Il falco d'oro (1955) - Ines della Torre
 Agguato sul mare (1955) - Circe
 Hengst Maestoso Austria (1956) - Gräfin Marika Szilady
 Folies-Bergère (1956) - Suzy Morgan
 Parola di ladro (1957)
 The Black Devil (1957) - Duchessa Lucrezia
 Sénéchal le magnifique (1957) - La princesse Marida Ludibescu
 La Parisienne (1957) - La reine Greta
 Vacanze a Ischia (1957) - Carla Occhipinti
 Meine schöne Mama (1958) - Mathildes Mutter Maria
 The Captain's Table (1959) - Mrs. Porteous
 Violent Summer (1959) - (uncredited)
 Muerte al amanecer (1959) - Victoria Costa
 La Dolce Vita (1960) - Nadia
 Le signore (1960) - Tatiana Becker
 Letto a tre piazze (1960) - Amalia
 Maria, Registered in Bilbao (1960) - Berta
 Candide ou l'optimisme au XXe siècle (1960) - La dame de compagnie / Dame
 Mr. Topaze (1961) - Suzy
 Le pavé de Paris (1961) - Monique
 Gioventù di notte (1961) - Fulvia
 Mourir d'amour (1961) - Patricia
 Les croulants se portent bien (1961) - Thérèse
 Le jeu de la vérité (1961) - Solange Vérate
  (1962) - Hilde Goetz
  (1963) - Comtesse
 Maniac (1963) - Eve Beynat
 Zwei Whisky und ein Sofa (1963) - Mrs. Button
 Encounter in Salzburg (1964) - Felicitas Wilke
 The Crooked Road (1965) - Cosima
 The Adventurer of Tortuga (1965) - Dona Rosita
 Winnetou and Old Firehand (1966) - Michèle Mercier
 The Oldest Profession (1967) - Nadia (segment "Aujourd'hui")
 Two for the Road (1967) - Francoise Dalbret
 The Naked Runner (1967) - Karen Gisevius

References

External links
 
 
 Nadia Gray papers, 1930s-1977, held by the Billy Rose Theatre Division, New York Public Library for the Performing Arts

1923 births
1994 deaths
Romanian film actresses
French people of Romanian-Jewish descent
Romanian Jews
20th-century Romanian actresses
Romanian emigrants to France
French emigrants to the United States
American people of Romanian-Jewish descent